The Agrarian Union Party (PUA) was a political party in Romania.

History
The party first contested national elections in 1931, when it was part of the National Union alliance created for the general elections that year. The alliance won 289 of the 387 seats in the Chamber of Deputies, although the PUA did not take any of them.

The party contested the 1932 elections in alliance with the National Union–Iorga, the Democratic Nationalist Party and the National Party. The alliance won five seats in the Chamber of Deputies, of which the PUA took two.

The PUA contested the 1933 elections alone, receiving 2.5% of the vote and winning five seats in the Chamber. However, its vote share fell to 1.7% in the 1937 elections, resulting in it losing all five seats. It did not contest any further elections.

Electoral history

Legislative elections

References

Agrarian parties in Romania
Defunct political parties in Romania